Basil Sanderson, 1st Baron Sanderson of Ayot, MC (19 June 1894 – 15 August 1971), was a British businessman and public servant.

Early life
Basil Sanderson was born on 19 June 1894. His father, Harold Arthur Sanderson, was the general manager of the White Star Line. His mother was Maud Blood of New York City.

Sanderson was educated at the Rugby School and at Trinity College, Oxford. He was commissioned in the Duke of Lancaster's Own Yeomanry in the First World War and was awarded the Military Cross.

Career
Like his father he became involved in business, especially the shipping trade, and held directorships with numerous companies.

During the Second World War he served as Director of Shipping in Port at the Ministry of Shipping from 1939 to 1941 and as Head of Port Transit Control at the Ministry of War Transport from 1941 to 1945. After the war Sanderson was managing director of the Shaw Savill shipping line from 1945 to 1959 and the firm's chairman from 1947 to 1963. He was Sheriff of the County of London in 1948.

On 4 July 1960, he was raised to the peerage as Baron Sanderson of Ayot, of Welwyn in the County of Hertford.

Personal life
In 1927 Sanderson married Evelyn Constance Ismay (1897–1940), daughter of businessman J. Bruce Ismay who was the managing director of the White Star Line.

Transcripts of Sanderson's diaries and First World War memoirs are held at Churchill Archives Centre, Cambridge.

Death and legacy
Sanderson died on 15 August 1971, aged 77. He was succeeded in the barony by his eldest twin son Alan, who disclaimed the peerage for life the same year.

References

1894 births
1971 deaths
People from Welwyn
High Sheriffs of the County of London
Hereditary barons created by Elizabeth II
20th-century English businesspeople
Duke of Lancaster's Own Yeomanry officers